Prionacalus iphis is a species of longhorn beetle of the subfamily Prioninae.

Description
This species has mostly black body,  large mouthparts and long antennae.

Distribution
This species is found in Ecuador and Peru.

References
 Biolib
 Bezark, Larry G. A  Photographic Catalog of the Cerambycidae of the World
 Coleoptera-Atlas

Prioninae
Beetles described in 1872